The Silent Vow is a 1922 American silent Western film directed by William Duncan and starring Duncan, Edith Johnson and Dorothy Dwan. It is a Northern, following the activities of an officer of the Mounties.

Cast
 William Duncan as Richard Richard 'Dick' Stratton
 Edith Johnson as Anne
 Dorothy Dwan as Ethel
 Maude Emory as Elizabeth Stratton 
 J. Morris Foster as Doug Gorson
 Henry Hebert as Jim Gorson
 Fred Burley as Bill Gorson
 Jack Curtis as 'Sledge' Morton
 Charles Dudley as The Professor

References

Bibliography
 Rainey, Buck. Sweethearts of the Sage: Biographies and Filmographies of 258 actresses appearing in Western movies. McFarland & Company, 1992.

External links
 

1922 films
1922 Western (genre) films
American black-and-white films
Vitagraph Studios films
Films directed by William Duncan
Films set in Canada
Silent American Western (genre) films
1920s English-language films
1920s American films